Salut les copains - French for  hello mates or hi buddies - may refer to:

Salut les copains (radio program), a French radio variety program on Europe 1 
Yé-yé, a French style of music based on music broadcast by radio program Salut les copains
Salut les copains (magazine), a French music publication (later renamed Salut!)
Salut les copains (musical), a French musical based on the songs of the period
Salut les copains (album series), series of compilation albums from the hits on Salut les copains radio program and the print magazine
"Salut les copains", 1957 song by French singer Gilbert Bécaud
Salut les copains, 1961 album by French singer Johnny Hallyday
"Salut les copains", 1981 song by French band La Souris Déglinguée